Chal Suz (also Romanized as Chāl Sūz; also known as Chāl Sabz and Chālsabz) is a village in Qalayi Rural District, Firuzabad District, Selseleh County, Lorestan Province, Iran. At the 2006 census, its population was 47, in 8 families.

References 

Towns and villages in Selseleh County